Albio B. Sires (born January 26, 1951) is a Cuban-born American businessman and politician who served as the U.S. representative for  from 2006 to 2023. Sires is a member of the Democratic Party. On December 19, 2021, it was reported that Sires would not run for reelection to Congress in 2022. On June 3, 2022, it was announced that Sires intends to run for mayor of West New York, a position he held from 1995 to 2006, after his Congressional term ends in 2023.

Sires represented district 33 in the New Jersey General Assembly from 2000 to 2006, serving as Speaker of the New Jersey House from 2002 to 2006. 

In January 2023, Sires announced his candidacy for mayor of West New York.

Early life
Sires was born on January 26, 1951, in Bejucal, Cuba. He immigrated to the United States with his family at age 11 with the help of relatives in the U.S. He eventually settled in West New York, New Jersey; he still lives there, in a town that was 78.08% Hispanic according to the 2010 census. He attended Public School 4, where he and his brother were two of only three Latinos in the school. Sires learned English from a teacher who used flashcards and phonetics, and subsequently attended Memorial High School, where he was a star basketball player, whose skills on the court helped him obtain a basketball scholarship to Saint Peter's College. He received a B.A. in 1974 in Spanish and marketing. He received an M.A. in Spanish from Middlebury College in 1985.

Early career

Teaching and business
Sires worked at Memorial High School as a teacher and coach. He is the owner of A.M. Title Agency Inc.

New Jersey government

Sires first ran for office as the Republican nominee for New Jersey's 14th congressional district.

Sires was the first Hispanic mayor of West New York and in 2004 was elected mayor of the year by his fellow mayors.

Sires served as the Speaker of the Assembly from 2002 to 2006 and was the first Hispanic person to serve as New Jersey's Assembly Speaker. He was considered a surprise pick for speaker, since he had only served one term in the Assembly before taking the position. It has been reported that he was elected as speaker after Governor-elect Jim McGreevey decided he did not want then Assembly Minority Leader Joseph Doria, a former speaker, to serve as speaker during his governorship.

Sires was an active Democrat in the 1970s and 1980s. He switched to the Republican Party in 1985 and ran for Congress in 1986 against Frank Guarini. Sires lost that election, 71% to 26%. Sires left the Republican Party in 1994 and became a registered independent. Sires rejoined the Democratic Party in 1998. Three years later, he became speaker.

During his tenure as speaker, Sires served as acting governor of New Jersey on several occasions, when McGreevey and Richard Codey left the state. He was the first Hispanic person to serve as an acting governor of New Jersey. As acting governor, Sires signed several bills into law and performed routine duties of the office.

For the 2006–08 legislative session, Sires was given the largely honorary title of Speaker Emeritus. He is a former chair of the Legislative Services Commission. Sires stepped down from his seat in the Assembly, and was replaced by Silverio Vega, whom the Democratic district committee chose to replace Sires. Vega was sworn into office on December 11, 2006.

Sires was the mayor of West New York, New Jersey, from 1995 to 2006. He was succeeded by Vega, who will retain his mayoral seat while he simultaneously serves in the Assembly, joining three fellow Hudson County mayors—Brian Stack of Union City in the Assembly and Nicholas Sacco of North Bergen and Joseph Doria of Bayonne in the New Jersey Senate—who serve as both mayors and in the New Jersey Legislature. For many years, it was common for New Jersey mayors to serve in the legislature; this practice of "double dipping" was abolished in 2006, but who had been in both positions before the February 1, 2008, cutoff date were grandfathered in and could retain both jobs. During the time that Sires served in the Assembly, he was paid $49,000 for his state legislative position and $15,000 annually as mayor.

U.S. House of Representatives

Tenure

Sires had voted with the Democratic Party 93% of the time since joining Congress.

Sires was a member of the Congressional Cuba Democracy Caucus.

Mass transit
Sires is seen as a "champion of mass transit". He supports federal funding for public transportation projects, believing they will help his constituents. He was an advocate for a $9 billion "federal, state and locally-funded public transit tunnel from New Jersey to New York that broke ground in June 2009." The project was expected to employ thousands of people.

In March 2012, Sires pushed for a two-year bill that would help by funding highways and mass transit. He also pushed to extend the surface transportation bill so the House and Senate could reconcile the differences between the House bill and the Moving Ahead for Progress in the 21st Century Act (MAP-21).

Housing
Sires has made affordable housing one of his priorities. Residents of his district pay more for housing—including rent and home prices—than most places in the country. He has supported legislation focused on making housing more affordable.

Iran deal
Sires opposed the nuclear deal with Iran, saying, "I do not feel the agreement will prevent them from acquiring a nuclear weapon."

Nagorno-Karabakh conflict
On October 1, 2020, Sires co-signed a letter to Secretary of State Mike Pompeo that condemned Azerbaijan’s offensive operations against the Armenian-occupied enclave of Nagorno-Karabakh and denounced Turkey’s role in the Nagorno-Karabakh conflict.

Committee assignments
Committee on Foreign Affairs
Subcommittee on Europe and Eurasia
Subcommittee on the Western Hemisphere (Chair)
Committee on Transportation and Infrastructure
Subcommittee on Highways and Transit
Subcommittee on Railroads, Pipelines, and Hazardous Materials
Committee on the Budget

Caucus memberships
 Congressional Arts Caucus
Congressional Hispanic Caucus

Political campaigns
2006

In 2006, 13-year incumbent Democrat Bob Menendez moved to the United States Senate to fill the seat vacated by Governor of New Jersey Jon Corzine. Sires then entered the race to succeed him. He ran in two Democratic primary elections on June 6, 2006—a special primary for the last two months of Menendez's seventh term, and a regular primary for a full two-year term.

In the special primary to fill the remaining two months, Sires won about 90% of the vote, defeating James Geron. This all but assured Sires of being the next congressman from this heavily Democratic, Latino-majority district. Sires beat Assemblyman and Perth Amboy Mayor Joseph Vas in a bitter primary with 68% of the vote, winning in Union, Hudson and Essex Counties, while Vas won Middlesex County. No Republican even filed, assuring Sires of a full term. The 13th was so heavily Democratic that any Republican candidate would have faced nearly impossible odds.

Sires faced Republican John Guarini—a salesman and second cousin of former Congressman Frank J. Guarini—who was unopposed for the GOP nomination. Vas did not seek the unexpired term seat. After winning the election with 78% of the vote, Sires was sworn into the House on November 13, 2006, to fill the remainder of Menendez's term.

CQPolitics wrote, "Sires’ likely November victories would cap off his ambitions for a House seat, which he first expressed exactly 20 years ago under very different circumstances. He ran that year as the Republican challenger to entrenched incumbent Guarini, but managed only 27 percent of the vote."

Sires is part of a handful of Cuban lawmakers serving in the House, though, other than during the lone term served by Florida's Joe Garcia from 2013 to 2015, he has been the only Democrat.

2010

The New York Times rated the 13th district "solid Democratic" in 2010. Sires was challenged by Republican nominee Henrietta Dwyer; he defeated her with 74% of the vote.

2012

After New Jersey lost a district in the 2010 census, Sires ran for reelection in the 8th district, essentially a reconfigured version of the old 13th. In the primary election, he faced 25-year-old candidate Michael J. Shurin, whose campaign largely focused on the legalization of marijuana.

Electoral history

Awards and honors
On October 4, 2013, Sires's hometown of West New York, New Jersey, honored him by renaming its Public School No. 4 the Albio Sires Elementary School. The school, at 6300 Palisade Avenue, is the elementary school Sires attended as a child. In attendance at the ceremony were West New York Mayor Felix Roque and U.S. Senator Robert Menendez.

Return to local politics
Sires is a candidate in the 2023 campaign for mayor of West New York, an office he held before being elected to Congress.

Personal life
Sires and his wife, Adrienne, live in West New York, New Jersey.

See also
 List of Hispanic and Latino Americans in the United States Congress

References

External links

|-

|-

|-

1951 births
20th-century American politicians
21st-century American politicians
American politicians of Cuban descent
Cuban emigrants to the United States
Democratic Party members of the United States House of Representatives from New Jersey
Hispanic and Latino American mayors in New Jersey
Hispanic and Latino American members of the United States Congress
Hispanic and Latino American state legislators in New Jersey
Living people
Mayors of places in New Jersey
Memorial High School (West New York, New Jersey) alumni
Middlebury College alumni
People from Bejucal
People from West New York, New Jersey
People with acquired American citizenship
Saint Peter's University alumni
Speakers of the New Jersey General Assembly